Acanthosaura meridiona is a species of agama found in Thailand.

References

meridiona
Reptiles of Thailand
Reptiles described in 2022